Black Mesa (also called Big Mountain) is an upland mountainous mesa of Arizona, north-trending in Navajo County, west and southeast-trending in Apache County. In Navajo it is called  ('Black Mountain') and during Mexican rule of Arizona it was called Mesa de las Vacas (Spanish for 'mesa of the cows').  It derives its dark appearance from its pinyon-juniper and mixed conifer woodlands.

Geography

The mesa is located on the Colorado Plateau near Kayenta, Arizona, and rises to over 8168 feet. Its highest peak is located on Black Mesa's northern rim, a few miles south of the town of Kayenta. Reliable springs surfacing at several locations mean the mesa is more suitable for continuous habitation than much of the surrounding desert area.  It is now split between the Hopi and Diné (Navajo) tribal reservations.

Black Mesa is also the name of a small Navajo community off BIA-8066, which lies 17 miles west of Rough Rock, 20 miles north of Blue Gap and 25 miles northeast of Pinon. In the area is a local Chapter House and a community school.

The mesa is located within, and gives its name to, the Black Mesa Basin.

Mining

Since the 1960s the mesa has been strip mined for coal by the Peabody Western Coal Company, stirring a controversy over Peabody Energy's use of groundwater to transport coal.

In 2013, the Climate Justice Alliance (CJA), collaborating with the Black Mesa Water Coalition, held their first national gathering in opposition to the strip mining of the mesa. The gathering had an attendance of 100 members.

See also

 Black Mesa Peabody Coal debate
 Black Mesa and Lake Powell Railroad

References

Mesas of Arizona
Landforms of Apache County, Arizona
Landforms of Navajo County, Arizona
Unincorporated communities in Navajo County, Arizona
Geography of the Navajo Nation
Hopi Reservation
Unincorporated communities in Arizona